Ringdroid is an open source Ringtone creation utility application that runs on the Android Operating System. Ringdroid lets users record and edit audio files for use as ringtones, alarms or notifications.

Features
Ringdroid has a graphical editor that displays the waveform similar to pro-audio software allowing users to select the portion of a song they want.   Each audio section is highlighted with divider lines having handles for touch-dragging.  There are also inputs for numerical values for the start and end points and controls to zoom in and out on the waveform.  Users can save files as a ringtone, an alarm or a notification. Ringdroid does not have the ability to fade or loop.

Ringdroid supports MP3, WAV, OGG Vorbis, AAC, MP4, 3GPP, and AMR file formats

History
Ringdroid 1.0 was released in October 2008, a month after the launch of Android 1.0. Development continued through 2010 with several developers from Google contributing to the project.   The last APK posted to the development site was in 2010.  However, the last update in Google Play was on August 23, 2012. As of May 2015, the project has moved to GitHub.

Reception
Reception has been very favorable.  As of February 2014, the Google Play Store lists the Ringdroid as being installed on 10,000,000–50,000,000 devices, with an average rating of 4.5/5 from over 190,000 reviews. It received 4.5/5 score in a review from AndroidTapp,.  and "App of the day" from Pocket Lint, describing it as "Simple, effective, very smooth and fun." Several publications described it as a "Must Have".

See also
 List of open source Android applications

External links
 Development Site
 
 
 www.coolapkapps.com/ringtone-apps-for-android

References

Free and open-source Android software